This is a list of the busiest airports in Oceania, ranked and broken down by its total passengers per year, which includes arrival, departure and transit passengers.

At a glance

Statistics 
Airports Council International's full-year figures are as follows. Note that all the statistics are taken from the year 2017, unless stated otherwise in the notes section.

See also
 
 World's busiest airports by passenger traffic
 World's busiest airports by traffic movements
 World's busiest airports by cargo traffic
 World's busiest airports by international passenger traffic
 World's busiest city airport systems by passenger traffic

References 
Based on the Airports Council International Data Centre

Aviation in Oceania

 Busiest
Oceania